Danzal James Baker  (born 10 October 1996), known professionally as Baker Boy, is a Yolngu rapper, dancer, artist, and actor. Baker Boy is known for performing original hip-hop songs incorporating both English and Yolŋu Matha and is one of the most prominent Aboriginal Australian rappers.

He was made Young Australian of the Year in 2019, and his song "Cool as Hell" was nominated in several categories in the 2019 ARIA Awards. In 2018, he won two awards at the National Indigenous Music Awards, and was named Male Artist of the Year in the National Dreamtime Awards. His debut album, Gela, was released on 15 October 2021. At the 2022 ARIA Music Awards he won five categories from seven nominations.

Early life

Danzal James Baker was born on 10 October 1996 in Darwin, Northern Territory, and grew up in the Arnhem Land communities of Milingimbi and Maningrida. He has one brother. His totem is the Olive python, his moiety is Dhuwa and his skin name is Burralung / Gela boy.

He completed Year 12 at Shalom Christian College in Townsville, Queensland, before attending the Aboriginal Centre for the Performing Arts in Brisbane. He developed his love of dancing and acting there, and was an original member of the Djuki Mala dance troupe, which toured Australia.

In 2016, Baker Boy featured in the video for "Yolngu Style", a modern contemporary dance music video created by a group of artists to inspire the world to dance, move and absorb the Yolngu style.

In 2016, Baker appeared on the "Indigenous" episode of the first series of Australian television series You Can't Ask That on ABC TV.

Personal life
 Baker was residing in Bendigo, Victoria, with his partner Aurie Spencer-Gill and his bulldog.

He has said that he wants to be an inspiration to Indigenous kids living in remote communities, and to combat "shame."

Career
In 2017, Baker Boy attracted national attention as the winner of the Triple J Unearthed National Indigenous Music Awards (NIMAs) Competition. releasing the singles "Cloud 9" featuring Kian and "Marryuna" featuring Yirrmal in the same year. Both singles were featured in Triple J's Hottest 100 of 2017.

In 2018, he performed with acts such as Yothu Yindi and Dizzee Rascal.

He performed as an opening act for American rapper 50 Cent in January 2018, along with A.B. Original.

His third single, "Mr. La Di Da Di" was released in April 2018. "Black Magic" featuring Dallas Woods, was released in July 2018.

On 25 January 2019, Baker released "Cool as Hell" Two days later, "Mr. La Di Da Di" was voted into Triple J's Hottest 100 of 2018.

In June 2019, Baker released "In Control". On 7 July, Baker Boy appeared on the children's television show, Play School, and performed "Hickory Dickory Dock" as part of NAIDOC Week.

Baker Boy was the headline act at the opening night of the 2019 Tarnanthi exhibition of Aboriginal and Torres Strait Islander art at the Art Gallery of South Australia on 17 October 2019, performing outside the Gallery on North Terrace, Adelaide.

Baker made his acting debut in True History of the Kelly Gang, released in cinemas in early January 2019 and later released on streaming service provider Stan from 26 January.

2020–present: Gela

On 16 September 2020, Baker began teasing a new song on social media, posting images of himself alongside Dallas Woods and Sampa the Great. On 23 September 2020, Baker released the single "Better Days".

On 25 September 2021, Baker Boy performed as part of the pre-match entertainment at the 2021 AFL Grand Final at Perth Stadium. 

On 15 October 2021, he released his debut studio album Gela, on which he is accompanied by Glen Gurruwiwi's vocals and Kevin Gurruwiwi playing yidaki on the track "Announcing the Journey".

Baker has performed in televised advertisements for Menulog and for Google.

Baker performed at the closing ceremony of the 2022 Commonwealth Games in Birmingham, as part of the handover to the Australian hosts of Victoria 2026.

Discography

Studio albums

Singles

As lead artist

As featured artist

Filmography

Music videos

Awards and nominations

AIR Awards
The Australian Independent Record Awards (known informally as the AIR Awards) is an annual awards night to recognise, promote and celebrate the success of Australia's Independent Music sector.

! 
|-
! scope="row" rowspan="3"| 2018
| Himself
| Best Independent Artist
| 
| rowspan="3"| 
|-
| "Marryuna"
| Best Independent Single or EP
| 
|-
| Himself
| Breakthrough Independent Artist
| 
|}

APRA Awards
The APRA Awards are held in Australia and New Zealand by the Australasian Performing Right Association to recognise songwriting skills, sales and airplay performance by its members annually.

! 
|-
| rowspan="4"| 2019
| rowspan="2"|  "Marryuna" (Danzal Baker, Dion Brownfield, Jerome Farah, Yirrmal Marika)
| Song of the Year
| 
| 
|-
| rowspan="2"| Urban Work of the Year
| 
| rowspan="3"| 
|-
| "Mr La Di Da Di" (Danzal Baker, Dion Brownfield, Jerome Farah, Dallas Woods)
| 
|-
| Danzal Baker p.k.a. Baker Boy
| Breakthrough Songwriter of the Year 
| 
|-
| 2020
| "Cool as Hell" (Danzal Baker, Carl Dimataga, Jesse Ferris, Morgan Jones, Brendan Tuckerman, Dallas Woods)
| Most Performed Urban Work of the Year
| 
| 
|-
| 2021 
| "Meditjin" - Baker Boy featuring JessB (Danzal Baker, Jess Bourke, Dion Brownfield, Jerome Farah, Dallas Woods)
| Song of the Year
| 
| 
|-
| 2022 
| "Ride" (Danzal Baker, Yirrmal Marika, Philip Norman, Dallas Woods)
| Song of the Year
| 
| 
|-
| rowspan="2"| 2023 
| "Headphones" (featuring Lara Andallo)
| rowspan="2"| Song of the Year 
|  
| rowspan="2"|  
|-
| "Wish You Well (featuring Bernard Fanning)
|  
|-
|}

ARIA Music Awards
The ARIA Music Awards is an annual award ceremony event celebrating the Australian music industry. At the ARIA Music Awards of 2019, Baker Boy was nominated for three categories, and received three more nominations in 2020. He headed the leader board in 2022 with five wins from seven nominations.

! 
|-
! scope="row" rowspan="3"| 2019
| rowspan="2"| "Cool as Hell"
| Best Hip Hop Release
| 
| rowspan="3"| 
|-
| Best Video
| 
|-
| Cool as Hell Tour
| Best Australian Live Act
| 
|-
! scope="row" rowspan="3"| 2020
| rowspan="2"| "Meditjin" (featuring JessB)
| Best Hip Hop Release
| 
| rowspan="3"| 
|-
| Best Video
| 
|-
| Falls Festival 
| Best Australian Live Act
| 
|-
! scope="row" rowspan="7"| 2022
| rowspan="3"| Gela
| Album of the Year
| 
| rowspan="7"| 
|-
| Best Solo Artist
| 
|-
| Best Hip Hop / Rap Release 
| 
|-
| Macario De Souza for "Wish You Well" Baker Boy (featuring Bernard Fanning)
| Best Video
| 
|-
| Gela Tour
| Best Live Act
| 
|-
| Adnate for Baker Boy Gela
| ARIA Award for Best Cover Art
| 
|-
| Pip Norman, Andrei Eremin, Dave Hammer for Baker Boy – Gela
| Mix Engineer – Best Mixed Album
| 
|-
|}

Australian Music Prize
The Australian Music Prize (the AMP) is an annual award of $30,000 given to an Australian band or solo artist in recognition of the merit of an album released during the year of award. It commenced in 2005.

|-
! scope="row"| 2021
| Gala
| Australian Music Prize
|

J Awards
The J Awards are an annual series of Australian music awards that were established by the Australian Broadcasting Corporation's youth-focused radio station Triple J. They commenced in 2005.

! 
|-
! scope="row"| 2017
| Himself
| Unearthed Artist of the Year
| 
| 
|-
! scope="row"| 2021
| Gela
| Australian Album of the Year
| 
| 
|}

MTV Europe Music Awards
The MTV Europe Music Awards is an award presented by Viacom International Media Networks to honour artists and music in pop culture.

! 
|-
! scope="row"| 2020
| Himself
| Best Australian Act
| 
| 
|}

Music Victoria Awards
The Music Victoria Awards, are an annual awards night celebrating Victorian music. The commenced in 2005.

! 
|-
! scope="row" rowspan="7"| 2018
| rowspan="6"| Himself
| Best Solo Act
| 
| rowspan="7"| 
|-
| Best Male Musician
| 
|-
| Best Live Act
| 
|-
| Best Hip Hop Act
| 
|-
| Victorian Breakthrough Act
| 
|-
| Archie Roach Award for Emerging Talent
| 
|-
| "Marryuna"
| Best Song
| 
|-
! scope="row"| 2019
| Himself
| Best Solo Act
| 
| 
|-
! scope="row" rowspan="2"| 2020
| "Move"
| Best Victorian Song
| 
| rowspan="2"| 
|-
| Himself
| Best Solo Artist
| 
|-
! scope="row" rowspan="2"| 2021
| rowspan="2"| Himself
| Best Regional/Outer Suburban Act
| 
| rowspan="2"|
|-
| Best Solo Act
| 
|-
! scope="row" rowspan="4"| 2022
| Gela
| Best Victorian Album
| 
| rowspan="4"|
|-
| "Survive"
| Best Victorian Song
| 
|-
| rowspan="2"| Himself
| Best Solo Artist
| 
|-
| Best Regional Act
|

National Dreamtime Awards
The National Dreamtime Awards, (also known as The Dreamtime Awards), are an annual celebration of Australian Aboriginal and Torres Strait Islander achievement in sport, arts, academic and community.

! 
|-
! scope="row"| 2018
| Himself
| Male Artist of the Year
| 
| 
|}

National Indigenous Music Awards
The National Indigenous Music Awards is an annual awards ceremony that recognises the achievements of Indigenous Australians in music.

! 
|-
! scope="row" rowspan="3"| 2018
| Himself
| Best New Talent
| 
| rowspan="3"| 
|-
| rowspan="2"| "Marryuna"
| Film Clip of the Year
| 
|-
| Song of the Year
| 
|-
! scope="row" rowspan="2"| 2019
| Himself
| Artist of the Year
| 
| rowspan="2"| 
|-
| "Black Magic"
| Song of the Year
| 
|-
! scope="row" rowspan="3"| 2020
| Himself
| Artist of the Year
| 
| rowspan="3"| 
|-
| rowspan="2"| "Meditjin" (featuring JessB)
| Film Clip of the Year
| 
|-
| Song of the Year
| 
|-
! scope="row" rowspan="3"| 2021
| Himself
| Artist of the Year
| 
| rowspan="3"| 
|-
| "Better Days" (with Dallas Woods & Sampa the Great)
| Song of the Year
| 
|-
| "Ride" (featuring Yirrmal)
| Film Clip of the Year
| 
|-
! scope="row" rowspan="3"| 2022
| Himself
| Artist of the Year
| 
| rowspan="3"| 
|-
| Gela
| Album of the Year
| 
|-
| "My Mind"
| Film Clip of the Year
| 
|}

National Live Music Awards
The National Live Music Awards (NLMAs) are a broad recognition of Australia's diverse live industry, celebrating the success of the Australian live scene. The awards commenced in 2016.

! 
|-
! scope="row" rowspan="4"| 2018
| rowspan="6"| Himself
| Live Act of the Year
| 
| rowspan="4"| 
|-
| Best New Act
| 
|-
| Live Hip Hop Act of the Year
| 
|-
| Northern Territory Live Act of the Year
| 
|-
! scope="row" rowspan="2"| 2019
| Live Hip Hop Act of the Year
| 
| rowspan="2"| 
|-
| Northern Territory Live Act of the Year
| 
|}

Rolling Stone Australia Awards
The Rolling Stone Australia Awards are awarded annually in January or February by the Australian edition of Rolling Stone magazine for outstanding contributions to popular culture in the previous year.

! 
|-
| 2021
| "Meditjin"
| Best Single
| 
| 
|-
| 2022
| Gela
| Best Record
| 
| 
|-

Vanda & Young Global Songwriting Competition
The Vanda & Young Global Songwriting Competition is an annual competition that "acknowledges great songwriting whilst supporting and raising money for Nordoff-Robbins" and is coordinated by Albert Music and APRA AMCOS. It commenced in 2009.

! 
|-
! scope="row"| 2020
| "Meditjin"
| Vanda & Young Global Songwriting Competition
| style="background:silver;"| 2nd
| 
|}

Young Australian of the Year 2019
In 2019, Baker Boy was awarded Young Australian of the Year. He delivered his acceptance speech in both English and Yolngu Matha.

Order of Australia Medal
In the 2021 Australia Day Honours, Baker was awarded the Medal of the Order of Australia (OAM) for service to the performing arts as a singer and musician.

Tours

Baker has performed at venues and events such as Yabun Festival (2018), BIGSOUND, Groovin' the Moo, the Woodford Folk Festival, 2021 AFL Grand Final, Laneway Festival, WOMADelaide, and Golden Plains Festival.

References
73.  Check out stellar line-up Yabun 2018

External links

 

1996 births
ARIA Award winners
Australian male dancers
Australian male rappers
Indigenous Australian musicians
Living people
Recipients of the Medal of the Order of Australia
Yolngu people